Draycott Sleights is a  biological Site of Special Scientific Interest at Draycott in the Mendip Hills, Somerset, England, notified in 1987. The name is pronounced locally as "Slates", presumably a variation on the Saxon word Slade meaning amongst other things hillside, rather than in the same manner as the Yorkshire place of the same spelling.

It includes Draycott Sleights, and Draycott Housegrounds, . Draycott Sleights is part of the Draycott Sleights Site of Special Scientific Interest (SSSI), Draycott Housegrounds is a County Wildlife Site. The entire reserve is within the Mendips Scarp Prime Biodiversity Area (PBA) and Mendip Hills Area of Outstanding Natural Beauty (AONB).

Draycott Sleights supports extensive areas of traditionally managed species-rich unimproved calcareous grassland. Additional interest lies in a rich invertebrate fauna. The varied topography together with the widespread scrub provide a number of locations with ideal conditions for invertebrates supporting a rich butterfly fauna typical of unimproved calcareous grassland. 32 species of resident breeding butterfly have been recorded. The occurrence of Adonis blue (Lysandra bellargus), silver-studded blue (Plebejus argus) and small blue (Cupido minimus) is of particular interest. Two nationally scarce species of fly, Symphoromyia immaculata and Bombylius canescens and one nationally scarce species of ant, Myrmica schencki have been recorded for this site.

References 

Mendip Hills
Sites of Special Scientific Interest in Somerset
Sites of Special Scientific Interest notified in 1987
Nature reserves in Somerset
Cheddar, Somerset